Hednesford is a town and a civil parish in the district of Cannock Chase, Staffordshire, England.  The parish contains six listed buildings that are recorded in the National Heritage List for England.  All the listed buildings are designated at Grade II, the lowest of the three grades, which is applied to "buildings of national importance and special interest".  The listed buildings consist of a farmhouse, a public house, a large house later used for other purposes, a war memorial, a church, and an associated shrine


Buildings

References

Citations

Sources

Lists of listed buildings in Staffordshire
Listed